The 1981–82 season was Burnley's second consecutive season in the third tier of English football. They were managed by Brian Miller in his second season in charge of the club.

Appearances and goals

|}

Matches

Football League Division Three
Key

In Result column, Burnley's score shown first
H = Home match
A = Away match

pen. = Penalty kick
o.g. = Own goal

Results

Final league position

FA Cup

League Cup

Football League Group Cup

References

Burnley F.C. seasons
Burnley